was a town located in Nasu District, Tochigi Prefecture, Japan.

As of 2003, the town had an estimated population of 18,799 and a density of 202.44 persons per km². The total area was 92.86 km².

On October 1, 2005, Karasuyama, along with the town of Minaminasu (also from Nasu District), was merged to create the city of Nasukarasuyama and no longer exists as an independent municipality.

External links
Nasukarasuyama official website 

Dissolved municipalities of Tochigi Prefecture